The Deep & Dark Blue is a graphic novel written and illustrated by Niki Smith. It tells the story of identical twins Grayce, a transgender girl, and Hawke, a cisgender boy, who have to flee from their home when their cousin stages a coup on the kingdom and kills the rest of their family.

Smith's debut middle grade novel was published on January 7, 2020 by a Little, Brown and Company imprint, and was received positively by critics, who praised the writer's worldbuilding and the novel's affirmative look on transgender identity.

Reception 
The Deep & Dark Blue received a starred review by Kirkus Reviews, which praised its usage of bright colors to draw attention to certain aspects of the story, as well as the novel's "[d]ynamic panel layouts" that "give the story momentum and help communicate the tone." The reviewer also praised the diversity of the supporting cast. Publishers Weekly praised the "anime-inspired illustrations" by Smith, including the facial expressions shown by the characters, as well as the "capable worldbuilding and a positive look at transgender identity" present in the novel.

Writing for the School Library Journal, Kelley Gile noted the novel's art style was inspired by mangas. Gile also mentioned the palette used in the novel, calling it "integral to the story". Kiri Palm, for the Bulletin of the Center for Children's Books said the novel "offers a refreshing spin on the crossdressing-for-noble-reasons trope" due to Grayce's story of self-discovery as a trans woman. Palm also mentions how the art plays a part in Grayce's revelation as it "allows the reader to slowly discover Grayce's comfort with feminine attire and the responsibilities of her new life in the Sisterhood", while her brother is not able to accept the same role.

In a review for The Comics Journal, Hillary Brown criticized the cover of the book, mentioning how some of the choices by the author "makes it feel like Smith is new to comics," but praised other aspects of the novel, such as the author's choice to not stretch "into a trilogy." Brown mentioned in a positive note how there is a bigger focus on "the discovery of one's true gender than in fighting sequences," and called the fighting scenes boring but "Grayce's face as she struggles with her new knowledge is touching and evocative." The reviewer also called attention to the pages' layout, saying they "create interesting compositions," and the color. Brown concluded the review by saying the novel "doesn't transcend its audience, but it plays to it okay."

Accolades

References 

2020 graphic novels
Children's books with transgender themes
LGBT-related graphic novels
Little, Brown and Company books
Twins in fiction
Novels with transgender themes
2020s LGBT novels
LGBT-related young adult novels
LGBT speculative fiction novels